{{DISPLAYTITLE:C5H10}}

C5H10 is the molecular formula' of 13 hydrocarbon isomers (represented by their CAS numbers on the chart). They can be divided into cycloalkanes and alkenes.

Cycloalkanes

 Cyclopentane (CAS 287-92-3)
 Methylcyclobutane (CAS 598-61-8)
 Cyclopropanes
 Ethylcyclopropane (CAS 1191-96-4)
 1,1-Dimethylcyclopropane (CAS 1630-94-0)
 (R,R)-1,2-dimethylcyclopropane or (1R-trans)-1,2-dimethylcyclopropane (CAS 20520-64-3)
 (S,S)-1,2-Dimethylcyclopropane or (1S-trans)-1,2-dimethylcyclopropane (CAS 38447-23-3)
 (R,S)-1,2-Dimethylcyclopropane or cis-1,2-dimethylcyclopropane (CAS 930-18-7)

Alkenes

 Pentenes
 1-Pentene (CAS 109-67-1)
 cis-2-Pentene (CAS 627-20-3)
 trans-2-pentene (CAS 646-04-8)
Butenes
 2-Methyl-1-butene (CAS 563-46-2)
 3-Methyl-1-butene (CAS 563-45-1)
 2-Methyl-2-butene (CAS 513-35-9)